Marciano Saldías Barba (born April 25, 1966 in Santa Cruz de la Sierra) is a former Bolivian football defender who spent most of his career at Oriente Petrolero.

Club career
Saldías joined Oriente Petrolero in 1984. He along other important players like Erwin "Chichi" Romero, Luis Cristaldo and Celio Alves formed an exceptional team that represented Bolivia at club level in several Copa Libertadores editions of the late 1980s and early 1990s. Playing for Oriente, he won the national title in 1990. Saldías also had a brief spell with Paraguayan club Cerro Porteño in 1992. The following year he joined Destroyers before returning to Oriente for a second stint in 1994. The Strongest signed him in 1997, but he left after only one season with the atigrados. He retired from football in 1999 while playing for Club Aurora in Copa Simón Bolívar.

National team
He played for the Bolivia national team between 1984 and 1993, including participations in Copa América 1987, Copa América 1989 and Copa América 1991.

Honours

Club
 Oriente Petrolero
 Liga de Fútbol Profesional Boliviano: 1990
 Cerro Porteño
 Primera División de Paraguay: 1992

External links
 Marciano Saldías 
 Huella. Un lateral letal 

1966 births
Living people
Sportspeople from Santa Cruz de la Sierra
Bolivian footballers
Bolivian expatriate footballers
Bolivia international footballers
Association football defenders
Oriente Petrolero players
Club Destroyers players
The Strongest players
Club Aurora players
Cerro Porteño players
Expatriate footballers in Paraguay
1987 Copa América players
1989 Copa América players
1991 Copa América players